Tamás Terlaky is a Hungarian-Canadian-American professor of Industrial and Systems Engineering at Lehigh University. He is especially well known for his work on criss-cross algorithms, interior-point methods, Klee-Minty examples for path following algorithms, and optimization.

Biography
Terlaky was born on January 10, 1955, in Kaposvár, Hungary. He studied Mathematics and Operations Research at the Eötvös Loránd University in Budapest, Hungary. He earned his Ph.D. in 1981 under the supervision of Emil Klafszky. Terlaky taught at Eötvös Loránd University from 1981 to 1989; at the Delft University of Technology from 1989 to 1999; and at McMaster University in Hamilton, Ontario from 1999 to 2008, when he moved to Lehigh University. At Lehigh, he holds the George N. and Soteria Kledaras Endowed Chair. From 2008 to 2017, he served as the Chair of the Industrial and Systems Engineering Department. Since 2020 he is Director of the Quantum Computing and Optimization Laboratory.

He was founding Chair (2000) and since 2003 Honorary Chair of EUROPT, The Continuous Optimization Working group of EURO. From 2017 to 2019, he was elected as Chair of the SIAM Activity Group of Optimization. Since 2019, he is Vice President of INFORMS.

Career
In 1985 and 1987, Terlaky independently published on the criss-cross algorithm. The theory of oriented matroids has also been used by Terlaky and Zhang (1991) to prove that their criss-cross algorithms have finite termination for linear programming problems.

Terlaky has previously taught at Eötvös Loránd University and Delft University of Technology. From 1999 to 2008, he was Professor at the Department of Computing and Software at McMaster University, and was also the founding director of the School of Computational Engineering and Science at the same university.

In 2020, Terlaky, along with Luis Zuluaga and Boris Defourny, was the recipient of a large quantum computing research grant from DARPA.

Terlaky is also a founding editor-in-chief of Optimization and Engineering (founded in 1998), a journal specializing in mathematical optimization and its applications. He has served on numerous editorial boards, including the Journal of Optimization Theory and Applications, Computational Optimization and Applications, European Journal on Operational research, Optimization Methods and Software, Optimization Letters, and Journal of Computational Sciences.

Recognition
Terlaky has been elected as:

2005: Fellow of the Fields Institute
2017: Fellow of the Institute for Operations Research and the Management Sciences (INFORMS)
2018: Fellow of the Society for Industrial and Applied Mathematics (SIAM)
2020: Fellow of the Canadian Academy of Engineering
2021: Fellow of the International Federation of Operational Research Societies (IFORS)

In 2017, he was awarded the 2017 Daniel H. Wagner Prize for Excellence in Operations Research Practice for helping to improve algorithmic efficiency at the Pennsylvania Department of Corrections by creating the unique Inmate Assignment Decision Support System (IADSS).

Also, in 2019, for his pioneering work in correctional systems, he was awarded the Outstanding Innovation in Service Systems Engineering award by the Institute of Industrial Engineers (IISE).

Additional awards:
Award of Merit of the Canadian Operations Research Society (2015)
Egerváry Award of the Hungarian Operations Research Society (2017)
Farkas Award of the János Bolyai Mathematical Society of Hungary (1985)
Four-time finalist of the George D. Smith Prizre of INFORMS-UPS (2021, 2013, 2014, 2015)
Distinguished Visiting Professor Award, the University of Pannonia, Veszprém, Hungary (2018)

Selected publications

Books
Roos, Cornelis; Terlaky, Tamás; Vial, Jean-Philippe (1997). Interior Point Approach  to Linear Optimization: Theory and Algorithms. John Wiley & Sons, Chichester, New York, (second print by Springer Science (1998).
Peng, Jiming; Roos, Cornelis; Terlaky, Tamás (2002). Self-Regularity: A New Paradigm for Primal-Dual Interior Point Methods”. Princeton University Press.
Terlaky, Tamás (editor) (1996). Interior Point Methods in Mathematical Programming. Kluwer Academic Publisher, Dordrecht, The Netherlands.
Terlaky, Tamás; Anjos, Miguel F.; Ahmed, Shabbir (editors) (2017). Handbook of Advances and Trends in Optimization with Engineering Applications, Advances and Trends in Optimization with Engineering Applications. MOS-SIAM Book Series on Optimization, SIAM, Philadelphia.

Papers
Terlaky has published over 160 papers, some of which are:

 
 
 

 
 
 
 
 
 
 
 
Pólik, Imre; Terlaky, Tamás (2007) “A survey of the S-lemma” SIAM Review 49 (3), 371-418.
Bomze, Immanuael; Dür, Mirjam; De Klerk, Etienne; Roos, Cornelis; Quist, Arie;  Terlaky, Tamás (2000) “On copositive programming and standard quadratic optimization problems” Journal of Global Optimization 18 (4), 301-320.
Nemirovski, Arkadii; Roos, Cornelis; Terlaky; Tamás (1999) “On maximization of quadratic form over intersection of ellipsoids with common center” Mathematical Programming 86 (3), 463-473.
Shahabsafa, Mohammad; Terlaky, Tamás; Gudapati, Chaitanya; Sharma, Anshul; Plebani, Louis; Wilson, George; Bucklen, Kristofer (2018) “The Inmate Assignment and Scheduling Problem and its Application in the PA Department of Correction”, Interfaces 48 (5), 467-483.
Andersen, Erling D.; Roos, Cornelis; Terlaky, Tamás (2003) “On implementing a primal-dual interior-point method for conic quadratic optimization” Mathematical Programming 95 (2), 249-277.
De Klerk, Etienne; Roos, Cornelis; Terlaky, Tamás (1997) “Initialization in semidefinite programming via a self-dual skew-symmetric embedding” Operations Research Letters 20 (5), 213-221.
Deza, Nematollahi & Terlaky (2008) Deza, Antoine; Nematollahi, Eissa; Terlaky, Tamás (May 2008). "How good are interior point methods? Klee–Minty cubes tighten iteration-complexity bounds". Mathematical Programming''. 113 (1): 1–14. CiteSeerX 10.1.1.214.111. . MR 2367063

See also
Criss-cross algorithm
Interior-point method
Klee–Minty cube

References

External links
Lehigh University official page
ResearchGate profile
Google Scholar page

Living people
20th-century Hungarian mathematicians
21st-century Hungarian mathematicians
Lehigh University faculty
Eötvös Loránd University alumni
People from Kaposvár
1955 births